Francisco "Paco" de Paula Bazán Landi (born 10 October 1980) is a Peruvian former goalkeeper. He last played for Universitario de Deportes.

Career
He started his career with Peruvian football Club Deportivo San Agustín (San Isidro District). Some of his former clubs are Universitario de Deportes, Olympiakos Nicosia and Anorthosis Famagusta.

Personal life
He is the son of doctor Carlos Bazán Zender, former Minister of Health and Beatriz Landi Bonafé. He studied at the Markham College in the city of Lima.

Titles

References

External links 
 Francisco De Paula Bazán at BDFA.com.ar 

1980 births
Living people
Footballers from Lima
Peruvian people of Italian descent
Association football goalkeepers
Peruvian footballers
Club Universitario de Deportes footballers
Juan Aurich footballers
Club Deportivo Wanka footballers
Pontevedra CF footballers
Alianza Atlético footballers
Anorthosis Famagusta F.C. players
Olympiakos Nicosia players
Cienciano footballers
Peruvian Primera División players
Cypriot First Division players
Peruvian expatriate footballers
Peruvian expatriate sportspeople in Cyprus
Expatriate footballers in Cyprus
2001 Copa América players